In mathematics, a continuous-time random walk (CTRW) is a generalization of a random walk where the wandering particle waits for a random time between jumps. It is a stochastic jump process with arbitrary distributions of jump lengths and waiting times. More generally it can be seen to be a special case of a Markov renewal process.

Motivation 

CTRW was introduced by Montroll and Weiss as a generalization of physical diffusion process to effectively describe anomalous diffusion, i.e., the super- and sub-diffusive cases. An equivalent formulation of the CTRW is given by generalized master equations. A connection between CTRWs and diffusion equations with fractional time derivatives has been established. Similarly, time-space fractional diffusion equations can be considered as CTRWs with continuously distributed jumps or continuum approximations of CTRWs on lattices.

Formulation 

A simple formulation of a CTRW is to consider the stochastic process  defined by

The probability for the process taking the value  at time  is then given by

Montroll–Weiss formula 

Similarly, the characteristic function of the jump distribution  is given by its Fourier transform:

One can show that the Laplace–Fourier transform of the probability  is given by

The above is called Montroll–Weiss formula.

Examples

References 

Variants of random walks